Doon is a city in Lyon County, Iowa, United States, along the Rock River. The population was 619 at the time of the 2020 census. The BNSF Railway passes through Doon.

History

Located on a plateau on the eastern bank of the Rock River, the city was named after the River Doon in Scotland, made famous as the subject of Robert Burns' poem, "The Banks O' Doon". Founded by G. W. Bowers and A. H. Davison on September 6, 1889, the railway town was connected first by the Rock Valley Railway, followed by the Iowa & Dakota Railroad. The city was incorporated on March 8, 1892.

Geography

The Rock River, a tributary of the Big Sioux River, flows past the north and west sides of the town and the Little Rock River flows past to the south to join The Rock just southwest of the community.

The city is served by U.S. Route 75, three miles east of Doon, connected by Iowa Highway 167. The Burlington Northern passes the west side of the community.

Demographics

2010 census
As of the census of 2010, there were 577 people, 214 households, and 150 families living in the city. The racial makeup of the city was 98.6% White, 1.2% from other races, and 0.2% from two or more races. Hispanic or Latino of any race were 2.4% of the population.

There were 214 households, of which 36.0% had children under the age of 18 living with them, 66.8% were married couples living together, 1.9% had a female householder with no husband present, 1.4% had a male householder with no wife present, and 29.9% were non-families. 26.6% of all households were made up of individuals, and 14.4% had someone living alone who was 65 years of age or older. The average household size was 2.70 and the average family size was 3.33.

The median age in the city was 32.5 years. 30.8% of residents were under the age of 18; 9.2% were between the ages of 18 and 24; 24.3% were from 25 to 44; 20.2% were from 45 to 64; and 15.4% were 65 years of age or older. The gender makeup of the city was 54.6% male and 45.4% female.

2000 census
As of the census of 2000, there were 533 people, 202 households, and 151 families living in the city. The racial makeup of the city was 99.81% White and 0.19% Native American. Hispanic or Latino of any race were 0.38% of the population.

There were 202 households, out of which 38.1% had children under the age of 18 living with them, 69.8% were married couples living together, 4.5% had a female householder with no husband present, and 24.8% were non-families. 22.8% of all households were made up of individuals, and 9.9% had someone living alone who was 65 years of age or older. The average household size was 2.64 and the average family size was 3.13.

In the city, the population was spread out, with 30.0% under the age of 18, 9.0% from 18 to 24, 27.0% from 25 to 44, 18.6% from 45 to 64, and 15.4% who were 65 years of age or older. The median age was 32 years. For every 100 females, there were 116.7 males. For every 100 females age 18 and over, there were 100.5 males.

The median income for a household in the city was $33,281, and the median income for a family was $39,773. Males had a median income of $26,607 versus $19,286 for females. The per capita income for the city was $14,698. About 6.4% of families and 7.0% of the population were below the poverty line, including 5.9% of those under age 18 and 12.1% of those age 65 or over.

Education
Doon is served by the Central Lyon Community School District.

Notable person
 Frederick Manfred, author

References

Further reading
 Tom Savage, A Dictionary of Iowa Place-names; 2007
 S. C. Hyde, Lyon County Genealogy -- Historical Sketch; 1872

External links

Cities in Iowa
Cities in Lyon County, Iowa